Jouni Tähti (born 4 April 1968) is a Finnish disabled pool player. He is a five-times world champion in 9-ball wheelchair billiards, having won the competition in 2002, 2009, 2010, 2011 and 2013. He won the silver in 2012 and the bronze in 2014. He has achieved a medal placing in every world championship he has participated in. In the European Pool Championships he has won 16 medal places making him one of the most successful players in this class. Tähti has played billiards since the age of eight.

He was born in Kaarina, Finland.

References 

World champions in cue sports
1968 births
Living people
People from Kaarina
Sportspeople from Southwest Finland